Eremothyris tabulatrix is a moth of the family Yponomeutidae. It is only known from Madagascar.

The wingspan is about 19 mm for the males and the holotype was provided from Île Sainte-Marie, an island off the east coast of Madagascar.

References

Meyrick, E. 1930a. Exotic Microlepidoptera 3. - — 3(18–20):545–640.

Yponomeutidae
Moths of Madagascar
Moths of Africa